HMS Paragon was an  that served in the Royal Navy during the First World War.  She was launched in 1913, and joined the 4th Destroyer Flotilla upon completion. Serving with the Grand Fleet in August 1914, Paragon moved to the Humber in the summer of 1916, then to Portsmouth, then to Devonport by 1917.  On 17 March 1917, fighting alongside  in an action in the Dover Strait with eight German torpedo boats, Paragon was sunk by torpedo.

Notes

References

 

Acasta-class destroyers
World War I destroyers of the United Kingdom
1913 ships
Ships built in Southampton
World War I shipwrecks in the English Channel
Maritime incidents in 1917
Ships built by John I. Thornycroft & Company